Heinrich Schmidt may refer to:

People
 Heinrich Schmidt (composer) (1904-1988), Austrian composer
 Heinrich Schmidt (philosopher) (1874–1935), German archivist, naturalist and philosopher professor
 Heinrich Schmidt (politician) (1902–1960), NSDAP politician
 SS-Hauptsturmführer Heinrich Schmidt (physician) (1912–2000), medic at Majdanek extermination camp
 Heinrich Julian Schmidt (1818–1886), German journalist
 Carl Ernst Heinrich Schmidt (1822–1894), Russian chemist
 Heinrich Schmidt (footballer) (born 1912), German footballer

Ships
 , a German cargo ship in service 1936–45.